Ahlstad Hills is a group of rock hills just east of Cumulus Mountain in the Mühlig-Hofmann Mountains of Queen Maud Land. It was plotted from surveys and air photos by the Sixth Norwegian Antarctic Expedition (1956–60), which gave it the name Ahlstadhottane.

Hills of Queen Maud Land
Princess Astrid Coast